Bandish Bandits is an Indian musical romantic drama streaming television series on Amazon Prime Video created by Amritpal Singh Bindra and Anand Tiwari, produced by Still & Still Moving Pictures and directed by Anand Tiwari. The script was written by Bindra, Tiwari and Lara Chandni. The series feature debutants Ritwik Bhowmik as Radhe Rathod, a Hindustani Classical musician and Shreya Chaudhary as Tamanna Sharma, a pop singer, who hail from different worlds of music. Exploring the debate of music being a discipline versus a means of liberation. The series also features Naseeruddin Shah, Sheeba Chaddha and Atul Kulkarni.

The series officially announced in February 2019, and principal shoot took place across Jodhpur and Bikaner in Rajasthan. The film's soundtrack album and background score is composed by Shankar–Ehsaan–Loy, in their maiden attempt in scoring music for web series, and the soundtrack album received positive reviews from critics.

Bandish Bandits released on 4 August 2020, through Amazon Prime Video. The series received positive response from critics and audiences, praising the performances of the cast, writing and direction, songs and background score. It was listed by critics as one of the best Indian television shows of 2020. The series was nominated for seven Filmfare OTT Awards including, Best Supporting Actor for Shah, Best Supporting Actress for Chaddha and Best Original Story and Best Screenplay. In September 2020, it was officially renewed for a second season.

Premise 
Classical music student Radhe and pop sensation Tamanna, coming from very different worlds of music, set out together on a journey of self-discovery to see if opposites, though they might attract, can also adapt and go the long haul.

Cast 
 Ritwik Bhowmik as Radhe Rathod aka Radhemohan Rathod Jr.
 Shreya Chaudhary as Tamanna Sharma
 Naseeruddin Shah as Pandit Radhemohan Rathod, the current Sangeet Samrat and Radhe's grandfather
 Atul Kulkarni as Digvijay Rathod, Radhe's step-uncle, Pandit Radhemohan's abandoned son, Rajendra's step-brother and Mohini's former love interest
 Sheeba Chaddha as Mohini Rathod, Radhe's mother and Digvijay's former love interest
 Rajesh Tailang as Rajendra Rathod, Radhe's father and Digvijay's step-brother
 Amit Mistry as Devendra Rathod, Radhe's uncle, Rajendra's younger brother and Digvijay's step-brother
 Kunaal Roy Kapur as Arghya
 Rahul Kumar as Kabir
 Rituraj Singh as Harshvardhan Sharma, Tamanna's father
 Meghna Malik as Avantika Sharma, Tamanna's separated mother
 Tridha Choudhury as Sandhya Shekhawat, Radhe's brief fiancée
 Harssh A. Singh as Suryasen Shekhawat, Sandhya's Father
 Dilip Shankar as Rajaji
Avneet Kaur, Rohan Shah, Gajraj Rao, Shweta Tripathi, Chaitanya Sharma and Harleen Sethi in the song Chedkhaniyaan

Episodes

Production

Development 
On 14 February 2019, Vijay Subramaniam, chief director and head of content of Amazon Prime Video India, announced the release of six Indian originals, at the Television Critics Association's press tour held in Los Angeles, California. It was produced by Still and Still Moving Pictures, with the series created by Amritpal Singh Bindra and Anand Tiwari, who previously collabrated for Netflix film Love per Square Foot (2018), while Tiwari helmed the series. Bindra eventually stated that "The show is a millennial love story set against the backdrop of a clash between pop and Hindustani classical music. Based in Jodhpur, it explores the central theme of whether music is discipline or is it liberation." On 18 February 2019, the makers announced that Shankar–Ehsaan–Loy, will compose music for the series, making their debut on a digital platform.

Characters 
To play the lead characters Radhe and Tamanna, the makers hired debutants Ritwik Bhowmik and Shreya Chaudhary. Shreya, opened up about what drew her to the script stating, "The script chose me. I was immediately sold when I came to know about the director and the cast. And things got even better when I read it. Tamannah is very different from Shreya, so that was exciting. Moreover, this is a romantic show woven around music and that aspect was very fresh for me." Ritwik eventually took no time to give his nod to the project, after revealing details about the director and cast. He further stated "There were 10 blueprints that I had to go through in order to get Radhe right. It took time to understand him as he is very far off from who I am in my life. It is about relationship dynamics, art versus exhibitionism, mediocrity versus genius among other things." The two actors were trained under musician Akshit Parikh, who also made a cameo in the series.

Filming 
Principal Photography began in December 2018. The series were primarily shot in Jodhpur and Bikaner in Rajasthan. From its very first episode, the series had captured several traditional Rajasthani elements which include traditional paintings, couches, walls, huts and palaces. The makers shot few scenes at the Lakshmi Vilas Palace located in Rajasthan, and some of the scenes were shot at the deserts located in Bikaner district. In an interview with a media portal, actor Ritwik Bhowmik described his experience at the desserts of Bikaner. Bhowmik said that the team filmed one of the ragas in the Bikaner desert during the peak of summer. However, when the team was shooting the raga, it started to rain. Bhowmik said that this was "one of the most divine and magical experiences of his life". Shooting wrapped up in June 2019.

Soundtrack 

The music for Bandish Bandits was composed by Shankar–Ehsaan–Loy, in their debut composition for web series. On their inclusion, the composers stated that the background score will work in tandem to the story-line and building the scenes, the songs in this series form a part of the core narrative. The 11-song soundtrack album features lyrics by Divyanshu Malhotra, Tanishk S Nabar, Sameer Samant and also consists traditional verses. The soundtrack album was released on 27 July 2020, and received positive response from critics. Devarsi Ghosh of Scroll.in opined that "The blend of easy-listening pop and soaring semi-classical tunes brings to mind the trio's vast body of work". Baradwaj Rangan of Film Companion praised the album as a "magnificent east-meets-west soundtrack". Karthik Srinivasan of Milliblog hailed as "one of the best soundtracks in Hindi in recent times". Vipin Nair of Music Aloud reviewed as "a solid piece of work, despite noty being an extraordinary work by the trio (Shankar Mahadevan, Ehsaan Noorani and Loy Mendonsa), when it comes to classical fusion".

Release 
On 15 July 2019, Amazon Prime Video announced the series officially, with a first look and teaser being released to coincide the Prime Day celebrations. The series was initially scheduled to release in the last quarter of 2019. However, the series was scheduled for a release date in late 2020. On 13 July 2020, the makers unveiled the first look motion poster of the series, followed by the teaser on 16 July, and the trailer on 20 July. As a part of the promotional strategy, the makers hosted a virtual music concert on 3 August 2020, with Shankar–Ehsaan–Loy, Prateek Kuhad, Lisa Mishra, Armaan Malik, Jonita Gandhi and Mame Khan, giving live performances. The series premiered on 4 August 2020 on Amazon Prime Video. On 11 December 2020, the makers released the Tamil and Telugu dubbed versions of the series.

Reception 
Shubhra Gupta of The Indian Express reviewed "The conversation around the need to revive interest in classical music, and the fact that there doesn't need to be a rift between the classical and the popular, needs to be on-going. Despite its flaws, Bandish Bandits keeps up focus on this crucial theme." Nandini Ramanath of Scroll.in reviewed "One thing which is missing from the mix is a reflection of the audience base for classical music that allows performers to maintain tradition, pursue long careers, and become stars in their own right. An understanding of the ability of classical musicians to successfully renegotiate the boundaries of form and performance on their own terms is also absent." Saibal Chatterjee of NDTV gave three out of five stars and reviewed "Watch Bandish Bandits for the music and the actors: they soar even when the show doesn't."

Pratishruti Ganguly of Firstpost gave three out of five stating "What Bandish Bandits fails to do, is meld its musical largesse with the narrative scope of the show. Predictably, the length of the show (10 episodes, each over 40 minutes) demands a complex storyline that slowly builds its dramatic tension to climax to a rousing crescendo." Saraswati Datar of The News Minute stated "It's no masterpiece but watch Bandish Bandits for the lovely music that we will not get to hear on any other show, and for some its fabulous actors who quite like the music only get seen on web series like these."

In contrast Mini Anthikkad Chibber of The Hindu reviewed "Bandish Bandits would have scraped through as a 90-minute vanilla rom-com. Padding up that wafer-thin story with inanities and songs is a terrible test of the viewer's patience." Rahul Desai of Film Companion reviewed "There are several problems with Bandish Bandits, but purely on a storytelling level, the writing suffers from attention deficit disorder."

References

External links 
 
 

2020 Indian television series debuts
Indian drama television series
Amazon Prime Video original programming
Hindi-language television shows
Hindi-language web series